Mesembrinella is a genus of Neotropical flies in the family Mesembrinellidae, and formerly placed in the Calliphoridae. There are 15 described living species.

Species
M. abaca (Hall, 1948)
M. apollinaris Séguy, 1925
M. batesi Aldrich, 1922
M. bellardiana Aldrich, 1922
M. bicolor (Fabricius, 1805)
M. brunnipes Surcouf, 1919
†M. caenozoica Cerretti et al., 2017
M. currani Guimarães, 1977
M. flavicrura Aldrich, 1925
M. patriciae Wolff, 2013
M. peregrina Aldrich, 1922
M. pictipennis Aldrich, 1922
M. semihyalina Mello, 1967
M. townsendi Guimarães, 1977
M. umbrosa Aldrich, 1922
M. xanthorrina (Bigot, 1887)

References

Mesembrinellidae
Diptera of South America
Brachycera genera